Bad Girls is a 1994 American Western film directed by Jonathan Kaplan, and written by Ken Friedman and Yolande Turner. It stars Madeleine Stowe, Mary Stuart Masterson, Andie MacDowell and Drew Barrymore. Kaplan previously directed two of the film's stars: Masterson in Immediate Family (1989) and Stowe in Unlawful Entry (1992).

The film follows four former prostitutes on the run following a justifiable homicide and prison escape, who later encounter difficulties involving bank robbery and Pinkerton detectives.

Plot
Cody, Anita, Eileen and Lily work together in a brothel. When Anita is abused by a customer, Cody kills the man after he opens fire on her.

Narrowly escaping from a lynch mob, they are pursued by Pinkerton detectives hired by the widow of the man Cody shot. A man they meet on the road, McCoy, warns them of the pursuit.

They discuss riding to Oregon and starting a new life by taking up a claim to land inherited by Anita when her husband died of cholera. Cody offers to fund their new start from savings she has accumulated over the years. They go to the bank where Cody's savings are held. As she tries to close her account and make a withdrawal, the Pinkerton detectives catch up with her and try to arrest her. Leaving the bank manager's office, they find themselves in the middle of a bank robbery being staged by Kid Jarrett, a former lover of Cody's. He helps her escape from arrest but takes her money and tells her to find him.

During the escape, Eileen is arrested. Cody decides to go after the money and Kid Jarrett, telling Anita and Lily to wait in hiding. Anita and Lily return to town to break Eileen out of jail.

Cody's meeting with Kid Jarrett and Frank Jarrett does not go well. Kid Jarrett has not forgiven her for running out on him. He flogs her. Later, she is found unconscious by McCoy, who brings her to a healer in town and puts the Pinkerton detectives off her trail.

McCoy, Cody and the other three women meet up on the ranch of a farmer who'd been guarding Eileen's cell (and whom they'd tricked into releasing her). Cody plans revenge on Kid Jarrett. They foil a train robbery and steal his loot, at the cost of Lily being abducted. In turn, they abduct Frank Jarrett, Kid's father.

Regrouping again on the ranch, Anita leaves the others, frustrated with their revenge-motivated misadventures. She goes to a lawyer in town and finds out that the claim to land is only valid in the hands of her husband - as a woman, she cannot claim the land in Oregon.

Frank Jarrett antagonizes his captors until McCoy shoots him. Cody sends McCoy away. Meanwhile, Lily is being raped by her captors. McCoy stages a one-man rescue attempt and is captured, but Lily escapes.

Reunited, Cody, Anita and Eileen go to rescue Lily and meet her on the road. When she tells them that McCoy has been captured, they continue towards Kid Jarrett's hide out, and offer to trade the stolen loot for McCoy, who has been flogged and tortured. Kid agrees, then shoots McCoy as soon as the loot is handed over. He gives Cody the money he stole from her.

While retreating, one of Lily's would-be rapists taunts her, triggering a shootout that results in the deaths of Kid's entire gang.

After the shootout, Eileen marries the rancher, while Lily, Cody and Anita head west to start a new life, mentioning the Klondike Gold Rush of 1896. On the trail they overtake the Pinkerton detectives, who do not see them.

Cast

Production
The original director was Tamra Davis.

Three weeks into filming in Sonora, California, Davis was fired. The studio hired a new producer (Lynda Obst) director (Jonathan Kaplan), cinematographer (Ralf Bode) and screenwriter (Ken Friedman). The budget reportedly went up from $16.5 million to $20 million. After a month's hiatus, in which the script was rewritten to make it more action orientated, filming resumed.

Lynda Obst later said, "Jonathan is like a woman. His Heart Like a Wheel was the first feminist movie that knocked me out. He's more of a feminist than I am. I kept saying, 'Women do not want to ride into the sunset without men. We like men.'"

"I had actually liked the first script very much and would never have agreed to do it otherwise," said Stowe. "But I guess it wasn't translating."

Stowe later called it "a terrible, terrible movie... There's really nothing I can say about the experience that is positive, except that it brought me to Texas."

The railroad scenes were filmed on the Sierra Railroad in Tuolumne County, California.

Soundtrack
The film was written by Jerry Goldsmith, who composed the music as a cross between the style of his 1960s westerns and a contemporary sound. The soundtrack has been released twice; through 20th Century Fox Film Scores on 10 May 1994 and an extended, limited edition through La-La Land Records and Fox Music on 28 June 2011.

Track list for the La-La Land edition (tracks in italics also on the Fox release, asterisked tracks include previously unreleased material):

 The John (2:19)
 The Hanging (2:06)
 Which Way? (:42)
 The Snake (1:20)
 The Saw Mill (1:56)
 Keep Moving (:57)
 Bank Job* (5:16)
 The Gang/The Posse (:56)
 Return to the Fold (4:06)
 Don't Hurt Me (1:45)
 Jail Break (3:27)
 No Money (2:09)
 The Guests (:36)
 Welcome to My Home (1:20)
 The Pleasure of Your Company (:48)
 Ambush (5:45)
 What's Your Name? (1:18)
 The Claim (:25)
 Together (:39)
 I Shot Him* (2:46)
 Put It On (1:32)
 River Crossing (:34)
 Rescued (3:03)
 Josh’s Death (3:41)
 No Bullets (3:53)
 My Land/End Credits (6:53)

Reception
Bad Girls received overwhelmingly negative reviews from critics upon its release and currently holds a 13% "Rotten" rating on Rotten Tomatoes based on 24 reviews, with an average score of 3.6/10.

On April 22, 1994, Roger Ebert wrote for Chicago Sun-Times: "What a good idea, to make a Western about four tough women. And what a sad movie." Janet Maslin, in The New York Times review on the same day, ridiculed the film as "Cowpoke Barbie".

The film grossed $15,240,435 in the United States and Canada and $23 million worldwide.

Year-end lists 
 Top 10 worst (listed alphabetically, not ranked) – Mike Mayo, The Roanoke Times
 Worst films (not ranked) – Jeff Simon, The Buffalo News
Dishonorable mention – Glenn Lovell, San Jose Mercury News
 Dishonorable mention – Dan Craft, The Pantagraph

Home media
The film was released on VHS and on DVD, which contains an uncut extended version.

References

External links
 
 

1994 films
1990s action adventure films
1990s female buddy films
1990s satirical films
1994 Western (genre) films
20th Century Fox films
American action adventure films
American female buddy films
American satirical films
American Western (genre) films
1990s English-language films
1990s feminist films
Films about kidnapping
Films about friendship
Films about outlaws
Films about prostitution in the United States
Films directed by Jonathan Kaplan
Films scored by Jerry Goldsmith
Films set in the 1880s
Films shot in Texas
Girls with guns films
Films about rape in the United States
1990s American films